The 1980–81 Australia Tri-Nation Series (more commonly known as the 1980–81 World Series) was a cricket tournament held in Australia from 23 November 1980 to 3 February 1981. It was the second edition of the Australian Tri-Series, with  Australia playing host to India and New Zealand. The series was a part of the Indian and New Zealand tours.

After matches were played in Adelaide, Brisbane, Melbourne, Sydney and Perth throughout the entire group-stage, Australia and New Zealand qualified for the finals where after the underarm incident in the third final, Australia went on to win 3–1.

Points Table

Fixtures

Final series

1st Final

2nd Final

3rd Final

4th Final

References

1980 in Australian cricket
1980 in Indian cricket
1980 in New Zealand
1980–81 Australian cricket season
1981 in Australian cricket
1981 in Indian cricket
1981 in New Zealand
1980
1980–81
International cricket competitions from 1980–81 to 1985
1980–81